"The One" is a song recorded by American singer Tamar Braxton from her second studio album Love and War (2013). The song was released on May 7, 2013, as the second single from the album. Braxton co-wrote "The One" with Christopher Wallace, Christian Ward, James Mtume, Jean-Claude Olivier, Kevin Erondu, Sean Combs, and Shaunice Lasha Jones. Erondu produced the track. It is an uptempo song with lyrics about Braxton's love for her partner. "The One" samples Mtume's 1983 single "Juicy Fruit", previously used in The Notorious B.I.G.'s 1994 track "Juicy".

Critical response to "The One" was positive, with some critics praising it for its associations with the summer. The single appeared on several Billboard component charts. Gil Green directed the single's music video, which features Braxton and her boyfriend on a date at the Santa Monica Pier. Commentators responded positively to the video. Braxton further promoted "The One" through live performances.

Background and composition 
Tamar Braxton co-wrote "The One" with Christopher Wallace, Christian Ward, James Mtume, Jean-Claude Olivier, Kevin Erondu, Sean Combs, and Shaunice Lasha Jones. Erondu produced the song, and worked on the backing vocals. Mike Donaldson mixed and recorded the track. The song was released on May 7, 2013 through Epic and Streamline, as the second single from Braxton's second studio album Love and War (2013). It was made available as a CD single and a digital download.

"The One" includes a sample from Mtume's 1983 song "Juicy Fruit", which had been previously used for The Notorious B.I.G.'s 1994 single "Juicy". Braxton uses breathy vocals for the track. It is an uptempo song, and Braxton said: “It has so much energy, it’s so fun, it’s a summertime anthem record.” She described "The One" as a "throwback record". Tanya Rena Jefferson of AXS felt that the composition contained a "soulful, old school, hip-hop flavor". The lyrics revolve around how she "pledge[s] her allegiance to her man".

Reception 
"The One" received positive reviews from music critics. Idolator's Mike Wass wrote that it was "undeniably catchy and still sounds fresh months after release". Praising the sample as "a slick interpolation", Vibe's Kathy Iandoli said that Braxton "rides the beat with precision as she presses her breathy vocals". Citing it as an album highlight, Andy Kellman of AllMusic interpreted "The One" as a way "to compete with contemporary singers who emerged during the middle and late 2000s". Rick Florino of Artistdirect responded positively to the single for its "uplifting dynamics". In a 2015 article, Tanya Rena Jefferson described "The One" as one of Braxton's best songs.

Several critics associated "The One" with the summer. A writer for Rap-Up praised the single as a "summertime anthem", and it was included on Vulture.com's "All-Time Favorite Summer Songs" playlist. Sam Lansky of Idolator described it as a "smooth, summery jam", and Glamour's Phoebe Robinson cited the song in her list of music that best represented the summer of 2013, calling it "breezy, easy, and catchy".

"The One" appeared on several Billboard component charts. It peaked at number two and 34 on the Adult R&B Songs and the Hot R&B/Hip-Hop Songs charts, respectively. The song reached number ten on the Heatseekers Songs chart, and peaked at number 63 on the Digital Song Sales chart. "The One" was the second Love and War single to appear on the Adult R&B Airplay Billboard chart, following the title track.

Music video and live performances 
Gil Green directed the single's music video, which was uploaded on Braxton's YouTube account on May 30, 2013. A preview was shown during Braxton Family Values, a reality television series revolving around Braxton and her family. In the video, a pregnant Braxton plays carnival games with her boyfriend and dances on the Santa Monica Pier. Braxton described the concept as "a summer throwback", and compared the storyline to a high school date. During the scenes, she wears a pair of overalls. Braxton and her partner take pictures and have caricatures drawn for them. The video received a positive response from critics. A Rap-Up contributor praised it as "fun and flirty" and "feel-good". Sam Lanksy referred to the video as "a fairly simple visual accompaniment", while a writer for Jet wrote that it matched "the music’s fun summer time vibe". The video ran on BET, Centric, and VH1 Soul.

On July 29, 2013, Braxton performed "a slightly sped-up version" of "The One" during a Love and War showcase at the Emerson Theater. For the four-song set list, she wore "a sparkly black top and thigh-high boots". Braxton was accompanied by four male, back-up dancers during the performance. The set was filmed for an episode of Tamar & Vince, a reality television show about Braxton and her husband Vincent Herbert. Mike Wass praised Braxton for "danc[ing] along [and] playfully whipping her blond hair along with the music". Braxton sang "The One" as part of a medley of the Love and War singles for the 2013 Soul Train Music Awards. The single was included on the set list for her Love and War Tour.

Track listings

Credits and personnel 
Credits adapted from the liner notes of Love and War:

Songwriter – Christopher Wallace, Christian Ward aka Hitmaka, James Mtume, Jean Claude Olivier, Kevin Erondu, Sean Puffy Combs, Shaunice Lasha Jones
Producer, backing vocals – K.E. On The Track
Mixing and recording – Mike Donaldson

Charts

Weekly charts

Year-end charts

Release history

Notes

References 

Tamar Braxton songs
2013 singles
2013 songs
Songs written by Tamar Braxton
Epic Records singles
Songs written by James Mtume
Songs written by Jean-Claude Olivier
Songs written by Sean Combs
Songs written by the Notorious B.I.G.
Songs written by LaShawn Daniels
Songs written by Hitmaka
Songs written by K.E. on the Track
Song recordings produced by K.E. on the Track